21 Hayes is a trolleybus line operated by the San Francisco Municipal Railway (Muni). It connects the Civic Center to the neighborhoods northeast of Golden Gate Park in San Francisco.

History
Horsecar service was established on Hayes Street in 1860 by Thomas Hayes. By the time the Market Street Railway was incorporated in 1883, the Hayes line had been rebuilt to run cable cars and terminated at the Ferry Building. 

The 1906 San Francisco earthquake crippled the line. Though it was back in operation as an electrified streetcar less than two months after the disaster, the steep grade between Pierce and Scott was unsuitable for electric traction. United Railroads (successor to the Market Street Railway) compensated for this by establishing two new routes; the new "Hayes and Ellis" line ran from Ellis and Market outbound on Ellis, Divisadero, Hayes, and Stanyan to terminate at Fulton. This line was assigned the number 21 in 1911. A cutting to ease the grade between Pierce and Scott was cleared in 1914, allowing through-running the whole length of Hayes. In the 1930s, the line was extended west and north to terminate at 8th and Clement in the Inner Richmond. Streetcar service ended on June 5, 1948 and the line was converted to trolleybus operations the following year.

Service was discontinued in March 2020 amid the COVID-19 pandemic. The line returned to operation in July 2022, though with motor coaches and the inbound terminal truncated to Market Street.

References

External links

 21 Hayes — via SFMTA

San Francisco Municipal Railway trolleybus routes
Railway lines opened in 1860
Railway lines closed in 1948